The IIFA Glamour Star of the Year Award is a special award given to those who are found to be the most glamorous stars of that year. 

The winners are listed below:

See also 
 IIFA Awards
 Bollywood
 Cinema of India

International Indian Film Academy Awards